Tyrrellspass (IPA:[ˈbʲaləxˈanˠˈtʲɪɾʲiəliː]) is a Georgian village in County Westmeath, Ireland. Tyrrellspass won the Irish Tidy Towns Competition in 1969. As of the census in April 2016, the population of Tyrrellspass was 483.

History
The origins of the village settlement lie in the Nine Years' War (1594-1603), also called Tyrone's Rebellion. In 1597 there was a battle in Tyrrellspass and the Irish, between 300 and 400 strong and led by Richard Tyrrell, attacked and defeated the English army. Out of 1,000 English troops only one survived.
There is a historic castle on the edge of the town, built by Richard Tyrrell, a chief ally of Aodh Mór Ó Néill in the Nine Years' War. It is the only remaining castle of the Tyrrells, who came to Ireland around the time of the Norman invasion.

The current core of the village is a planned estate village dating from the late 18th century, and was influenced by the English style of planned villages.

The village has a distinctive green and crescent of houses, including the Church of Ireland church and what was previously the court house, which was redeveloped c. 1820 under the patronage of Jane MacKey, Countess of Belvedere (d. 1836). The Catholic Church of St. Stephen is located across from Tyrrellspass Castle and the Church of Ireland church is St. Sinian's.

The Belvedere Protestant Children's Orphanage operated in Tyrellspass from 1842 until 1943.

During the 1916 Easter Rising, some rebels barricaded a house in Meedin, Tyrrellspass, with the intention of waiting for reinforcements and then attacking surrounding police barracks. Local legend has it that Michael Collins stayed in this house, the home of the Malones, who still occupy it. The RIC attempted to capture the house three times. Twice they were repelled with gunfire, before they eventually succeeded on the Wednesday after Easter week, and arrested the two remaining rebels, Thomas and Joseph Malone. They were the last two men captured under arms during the Rising.

Sport
The local Gaelic football team, Tyrrellspass GAA, team won the Westmeath Senior Football Championship in 1999, 2006 and defended their title in 2007. In the 2007 Leinster Club Football Championship they progressed as far as the final, where they were beaten by the eventual All Ireland Club champions St. Vincents of Dublin.

The village also has a golf course, New Forest Golf Resort, which is located a mile outside the village. It is designed by golf course designer Peter McEvoy.

Notable people
James Daly,  Connaught Rangers mutineer
 Ray Kelly, priest and singer
Tomás Malone, Irish War of Independence veteran
Seosamh Ó Mhaoileoin, president of Republican Sinn Fein

Gallery

See also
 List of towns and villages in Ireland
 Cloncrow Bog (New Forest)

References

External links
 Village Website
 The Tidy Towns of Ireland "Celebrating 50 years"

Towns and villages in County Westmeath
Planned communities in the Republic of Ireland